Clark County is a county located in the south-central part of the U.S. state of Arkansas. As of the 2020 census, the population was 21,446. The county seat is Arkadelphia. The Arkadelphia, AR Micropolitan Statistical Area includes all of Clark County.

History
Ancient Indigenous peoples occupied areas along the waterways for thousands of years prior to European exploration. Among the various cultures was the Caddoan Mississippian culture, which developed by 1000CE and occupied certain sites in Arkansas at different times. This was the westernmost expression of the Mississippian culture, which developed a vast network and numerous centers of development throughout the Mississippi Valley and its tributaries. The Caddoans constructed substantial earthwork mounds in the areas of Arkansas and Texas; the largest in Arkansas is Battle Mound Site, built from 1200 to 1400 CE in what is present-day Lafayette County. Archeological evidence has established there was unbroken continuity from the Caddoan Mississippian people to the historic Caddo people and related Caddo-language speakers who encountered the first Europeans. Their descendants formed the modern Caddo Nation of Oklahoma.

19th century
Settlers in the 19th century found earthwork mounds, 10 to 15 feet in height, in areas around what developed as Arkadelphia, Arkansas. Some were excavated for pottery and other grave goods.

At the time of European-American settlement after the United States acquired this territory in the Louisiana Purchase of 1803, the pioneers encountered three major Native American tribes: the Caddo, who lived along the banks of the Caddo River; the Quapaw on the Ouachita River, for several miles below what is now Arkadelphia; and the Lenape (known then as Delaware, who were driven to this area by European pressure from the mid-Atlantic East Coast) along the lower Ouachita to below present-day Camden. (This site had been named as Écore à Fabre, after a colonial French trader Fabre.)

Clark County was the third county formed by Americans in Arkansas, on December 15, 1818, together with Hempstead and Pulaski counties.  The county is named after William Clark, then Governor of the Missouri Territory, which included present-day Arkansas. On November 1, 1833, the Arkansas territorial legislature created Pike County from western Clark County and part of northern Hempstead County. It was named after US explorer Zebulon Pike.

Arkadelphia was designated as the county seat in 1842. It became increasingly important as a hub after railroads were constructed to here that connected with numerous markets. Timber harvesting became important by the end of the century. By 1890, forest products were ranked next to agriculture in economic importance. In the 20th century, continued modern technological developments established the industry's continued importance in the county's economy.

Three of the six lynchings recorded in Clark County from 1877 to 1950 took place in a mass event in late January 1879. An African-American man, Ben Daniels, and three of his four sons (ranging in age from 22 to 18) were arrested as suspects in an alleged robbery and assault of a white man and held in the county jail. Daniels and two of his sons were forcibly taken out of the jail by a white mob and lynched by hanging from trees in the courthouse square, without trial. One son, believed to be Charles Daniels (22), survived for trial. He was convicted and served in prison until about 1886 or 1887.

20th century to present
From 1920 to 1960, the county population declined, as may be seen on the table below. The cotton culture had been  affected by the invasion of the boll weevil, which attacked the plants; and mechanization of agriculture, reducing the need for workers. In this period, many African-American families, who still constituted most of the farm workers, also left Arkansas and other parts of the rural South to escape Jim Crow oppression and seek better employment in Northern and Midwestern cities in the Great Migration. In the latter part of this period, some migrated to the West Coast, where the defense industry developed during and after World War II offered higher paying jobs.

At the same time, the lumber industry declined, also causing a loss of jobs. Several companies had operated sawmills and related businesses in Clark County in the early part of the century. The founders of the lumber town Graysonia, Arkansas moved to Springfield, Oregon, renaming their company as Roseboro Lumber. While manufacturing industries had entered the county, several had a downturn in the 1980s.

In the 1970s, the DeGray Dam and Lake were completed along the Caddo River, providing new areas in the county for tourism and recreation, which have become major components of the economy.

Geography

Major highways
 Interstate 30
 U.S. Highway 67
 Highway 7
 Highway 8
 Highway 26
 Highway 51
 Highway 53

Adjacent counties
 Hot Spring County (northeast)
 Dallas County (east)
 Ouachita County (southeast)
 Nevada County (southwest)
 Pike County (west)
 Montgomery County (northwest)

Demographics

2020 census

As of the 2020 United States census, there were 21,446 people, 8,446 households, and 5,253 families residing in the county.

2000 census
As of the 2000 census, there were 23,546 people, 8,912 households, and 5,819 families residing in the county.  The population density was 27 people per square mile (10/km2).  There were 10,166 housing units at an average density of 12 per square mile (5/km2).  The racial makeup of the county was 74.28% White, 22.02% Black or African American, 0.46% Native American, 0.62% Asian, 0.04% Pacific Islander, 1.37% from other races, and 1.20% from two or more races.  2.40% of the population were Hispanic or Latino of any race.

There were 8,912 households, out of which 29.80% had children under the age of 18 living with them, 49.80% were married couples living together, 12.20% had a female householder with no husband present, and 34.70% were non-families. 27.60% of all households were made up of individuals, and 12.40% had someone living alone who was 65 years of age or older.  The average household size was 2.38 and the average family size was 2.91.

In the county, the population was spread out, with 21.70% under the age of 18, 20.00% from 18 to 24, 23.80% from 25 to 44, 19.90% from 45 to 64, and 14.60% who were 65 years of age or older.  The median age was 32 years. For every 100 females there were 92.70 males.  For every 100 females age 18 and over, there were 88.90 males.

The median income for a household in the county was $28,845, and the median income for a family was $37,092. Males had a median income of $28,692 versus $19,886 for females. The per capita income for the county was $14,533.  About 13.50% of families and 19.10% of the population were below the poverty line, including 20.90% of those under age 18 and 18.40% of those age 65 or over.

Politics and government
John Kerry was the last Democrat to win the county in a presidential election, in 2004. John McCain and Mitt Romney defeated Barack Obama by single-digit margins here, and Donald Trump beat former Arkansas First Lady Hillary Clinton by a nine-point margin. Four years later, Trump defeated Joe Biden by a margin of over 14 points, the largest margin for a Republican since Richard Nixon defeated George McGovern by over 20 points in 1972. Mike Ross was the last Democrat to win the county in a gubernatorial election, in 2014. Conner Eldridge was the last Democrat to win the county in a US Senate election, in 2016.

As of 2023, Clark County is split between districts 89 and 90 in the Arkansas House of Representatives and fully contained within District 3 in the Arkansas Senate. All three seats are held by Republicans Justin Gonzales, Richard Womack, and Steve Crowell, respectively.

County Officials 
Republicans hold every county-wide office except the Sheriff and Collector, and have a seven-to-four super-majority on the Quorum Court. Most positions regularly go unopposed with only one candidate making the general election ballot. Democrats picked up one seat in 2022 by flipping District 2.

Communities

Incorporated cities 
 Amity
 Arkadelphia (county seat)
 Caddo Valley
 Gurdon

Incorporated towns
 Gum Springs
 Okolona
 Whelen Springs

Census-designated places
 Alpine
 Beirne

Other unincorporated communities
 Barringer
 Boswell
 Burtsell
 Curtis
 Fendley
 Hollywood
 Joan
 Kansas
 Vaden

Ghost towns and former communities 

 Clear Spring
 Graysonia
 Greenville (former county seat)
 Halfway
 Lenox
 Rome

Townships
Note: Unlike most Arkansas counties, Clark County has only one township. That township encompasses the entire county.

 Caddo

Notable residents 

 Daniel Davis, actor, best known for playing "Niles the butler" in the television series The Nanny, was born in Gurdon.
 Jody Evans, singer of country music, started his music career in Clark County, and works for the Arkadelphia Police Department.
 Cliff Harris, football player, Dallas Cowboys NFL, played college football for the Ouachita Baptist University football team.
 Bob C. Riley, politician, was born and raised in Arkadelphia. The Democrat served as Lieutenant Governor from 1971 to 1975. 
 Jerry Thomasson, politician and state representative, was born and raised in Arkadelphia. He switched to the Republican Party in 1966 and ran unsuccessfully for state attorney general in 1966 and 1968.
 Billy Bob Thornton, film actor, grew up in Alpine.

See also 
 Arkansas Highway 392 (1968–1977)
 List of lakes in Clark County, Arkansas
 National Register of Historic Places listings in Clark County, Arkansas

References

External links 

 1st Arkansas Infantry Regiment, CSA, Company B
 Lt. Andrew J. Pitner and Pvt. Charles Trickett, CSA Medal of Honor
 Stanford-Sellers murder, 1893
 Clark County Sheriff's Office

 
1818 establishments in Missouri Territory
Populated places established in 1818